Mablethorpe railway station was a station in the town of Mablethorpe, Lincolnshire which is now closed. The station was demolished soon after closure. Since 1985 only a short section of platform survives forming a wall of a flower bed in a public garden.

The station was situated on the north side of High Street, between the present-day Station Road and Alexandra Road.

In March 2021, a bid was submitted to restore the line to Mablethorpe as part of the third round of the Restoring Your Railway fund.

References

Disused railway stations in Lincolnshire
Former Great Northern Railway stations
Railway stations in Great Britain opened in 1877
Railway stations in Great Britain closed in 1970
Beeching closures in England
Mablethorpe